Giulio Alary (sometimes Alari) (1814-1891) was an Italian composer.  Born in Mantua, he was a student at the Milan Conservatory before relocating to Paris, where he died, in 1891.  He wrote three operas, as well as some orchestral and chamber music, arias, and melodies.  He also served as a conductor and singing teacher.

An excerpt from Le tre nozze, a polka with variations, is said to have been a particular favorite of Henriette Sontag.

Operas
 1840 – Rosmunda
 1851 – Le tre nozze
 1861 – La voix humaine

References
Giulio Alary at the Enciclopedia Treccani (in Italian)

1814 births
1891 deaths
Italian classical composers
Italian male classical composers
Italian conductors (music)
Italian male conductors (music)
Italian expatriates in France
Italian opera composers
Male opera composers
Milan Conservatory alumni
Musicians from Mantua
19th-century classical composers
19th-century conductors (music)
19th-century Italian composers